Ahmed Kendouci (born 22 June 1999) is an Algerian professional footballer who plays as a midfielder for Al Ahly and the Algerian national football team.

Carrer 
In 2023, he joined Al Ahly.

International goals

References

External links 

 

Living people
1999 births
Association football midfielders
Algerian footballers
Algeria international footballers
ES Sétif players
2022 African Nations Championship players
Algeria A' international footballers